Uspenovka is a rural locality (a selo) in Ivanovsky Selsoviet of Ivanovsky District, Amur Oblast, Russia. The population was 363 as of 2018. There are 6 streets.

Geography 
Uspenovka is located 11 km southeast of Ivanovka (the district's administrative centre) by road. Kreshchenovka is the nearest rural locality.

References 

Rural localities in Ivanovsky District, Amur Oblast